Mouse Practice was a game-based computer tutorial aimed at teaching new users how to operate a computer mouse at a time when many were unfamiliar with this feature of a computer.

Mouse Practice was created using MacroMind Director and released in 1992 by Apple for the Macintosh computer platform. It involved the user learning the key functions of the mouse by controlling a scuba diver in an underwater environment.

Another program, Mouse Basics, served a similar purpose on earlier Macintosh computers, but did not have the game-based approach of Mouse Practice.

Gameplay
The opening screen showed the scuba diver on a motorboat at sea inviting the user to join her as she was going exploring underwater. To get started, the user had to move the mouse so that the pointer was on the scuba diver—this required the skill of using the mouse to control the position of the pointer. Once the arrow has moved to the diver, she jumps into the ocean, then an animation showed the scuba diver descending.

Controlling the pointer

The next activity was to use a flashlight to look around while in the deep sea, requiring the use to move the mouse to control the flashlight in order to show a number of deep sea animals, such as jellyfish, gulper eels and squids This again worked on the basic skill of controlling the pointer by the use of moving the mouse. Once all of the animals have been illuminated, an animation showed the scuba diver traveling along holding onto an ascending whale's fin.

Point-and-click
In the next activity, set on a coral reef, the user was required to move the pointer to the puffer fish, and then click the mouse button on the fish. The user then had to click in crevices of the reef revealing other sea animals which were a lobster, an octopus, a stingray, a gray reef eel and a seahorse.  This taught the skill of pointing-and-clicking. After all animals had been revealed, an animation showed the scuba diver riding on a sea turtle saying "Let's see what else we can find".

Drag-and-drop
The final activity involved a sunken ship where the user would gather the treasures that are scattered all over the ocean floor and put them away in a nearby treasure chest. The user was required to point to each treasure as instructed, starting with the golden crown, then click on it and drag it to the treasure chest. Once all the treasure was collected, a hook appeared and the user had to drag the hook to the chest, and then release the mouse button to let it be lifted to the motorboat. These activities taught the skill of dragging-and-dropping.

Ending
In the final scene, the diver, who has put the treasure chest in the boat, bids the user farewell and says "If you want to go underwater again, point to me and click. If you want to stop, click the treasure chest". Clicking the diver would result in the tutorial being repeated, while clicking on the treasure chest would quit the program. Clicking the treasure chest was the only way out of the program; unlike other computer programs, Mouse Practice could not be exited until the mission was accomplished.

Compatibility
Mouse Practice was released with the classic Mac OS from System 6 to Mac OS 9, designed to operate on the Motorola 68k architecture. The software can also run on some other systems by way of an emulator. Mouse Practice was a default inclusion in the simplified At Ease graphical user interface (GUI).

References

1992 video games
Apple Inc. software
Classic Mac OS games
Classic Mac OS-only games
Video games developed in the United States